The 1988–89 Turkish Cup was the 27th edition of the annual tournament that determined the association football Süper Lig Turkish Cup champion under the auspices of the Turkish Football Federation (TFF). Beşiktaş successfully contested Fenerbahçe 1–3 in the final. The results of the tournament also determined which clubs would be promoted or relegated.

Quarter-finals

|}

Semi-finals

|}

Final

|}

References

1988-89
Cup
Turkey